The 2002–03 WHL season was the 37th season for the Western Hockey League. 19 teams completed a 72-game season.  The Kelowna Rockets won the President's Cup.

Regular season

Final standings

Eastern Conference

Western Conference

 Prince George Crosses over into U.S. Division playoffs

Scoring leaders
Note: GP = Games played; G = Goals; A = Assists; Pts = Points; PIM = Penalties in minutes

Goaltending leaders
Note: GP = Games played; Min = Minutes played; W = Wins; L = Losses; T = Ties ; GA = Goals against; SO = Total shutouts; SV% = Save percentage; GAA = Goals against average

2003 WHL Playoffs

Conference quarterfinals

Eastern Conference

Western Conference

Conference semifinals

Conference finals

WHL Championship

All-Star game

On November 12, the WHL Eastern All-Stars defeated the QMJHL Lebel All-Stars 5–2 at Hull, Quebec with a crowd of 2194.

On November 19, the WHL Western All-Stars defeated the OHL Eastern All-Stars 7–3 at Vancouver, British Columbia before a crowd of 7,046.

The WHL won the Hershey Cup as champion of the round robin format all-star tournament.

WHL awards

All-Star Teams

source: Western Hockey League press release

2003 Bantam draft
List of first round picks in the bantam draft.

See also
2003 Memorial Cup
2003 NHL Entry Draft
2002 in sports
2003 in sports

References
whl.ca
 2005–06 WHL Guide

Western Hockey League seasons
WHL
WHL